Mollasani Rural District is a rural district (dehestan) in the Central District of Bavi County, Khuzestan Province, Iran. At the 2006 census, its population was 7,129, in 1,403 families.  The rural district has 33 villages.

References 

Rural Districts of Khuzestan Province
Bavi County